Slavko Šurdonja (1 October 1912 – 8 January 1943) was a Croatian football player who appeared for Yugoslavia in international competitions.

Club career
He was famous as being a big, strong forward, with great ball control, excellent shot and an impeccable header.
Slavko started playing as right midfielder in his hometown club NK Orijent and spend some time playing in Zagreb's club 1.HŠK Građanski but, his best years were spent playing in BSK Beograd, from 1932 until 1940, where he won three national Championships. He played one season for SK Bata Borovo in 1940, and ended his career having already health problems in Belgrade's BASK and SK Jedinstvo, where he played until 1943.
He died in Belgrade during World War II, at age 30, from tuberculosis, in great poverty and hunger.

International career
Beside having played three matches for the Belgrade city selection, he played one match for the Yugoslavia national football team. It was in Warsaw on 10 September 1933 against Poland (3–4 loss) and he played as a right midfielder.

Honours
BSK Belgrade
3 times Yugoslav First League Champion: 1932–33, 1934–35 and 1935–36

References

External links
 
 Profile at Serbian Federation site

1912 births
1943 deaths
Footballers from Rijeka
Association football forwards
Yugoslav footballers
Yugoslavia international footballers
HNK Orijent players
HŠK Građanski Zagreb players
OFK Beograd players
FK BASK players
SK Jedinstvo Beograd players
Yugoslav First League players
20th-century deaths from tuberculosis
Tuberculosis deaths in Serbia